

Launch statistics

Rocket configurations

Launch sites

Launch outcomes

1957

1958

1959

References

Main Page
List of Atlas launches

Atlas